Familien Gyldenkål ( The Goldcabbage Family) is a 1975 Danish comedy film directed by Gabriel Axel.

It was the first in a series of three films about the eccentric Gyldenkål family, and was followed by The Goldcabbage Family Breaks the Bank (1976) also directed by Axel, and Familien Gyldenkål vinder valget (1977) directed by Bent Christensen.

Cast
 Axel Strøbye
 Kirsten Walther
 Birgitte Bruun
 Martin Miehe-Renard
 Karen Lykkehus
 Bertel Lauring
 Ove Sprogøe
 Lily Broberg
 Jens Okking
 Karl Stegger
 Brigitte Kolerus
 Helle Merete Sørensen
 Bjørn Puggaard-Müller
 Otto Brandenburg
 Lisbet Dahl
 Claus Ryskjær
 Hans Christian Ægidius
 Tommy Kenter
 Hardy Rafn
 Benny Hansen
 Ebba With
 Jens Brenaa
 Poul Thomsen
 Gyda Hansen
 Ernst Meyer
 Søren Rode
 Karl Gustav Ahlefeldt

References

External links
 

1975 films
Danish comedy films
1975 comedy films
Films directed by Gabriel Axel
1970s Danish-language films